The three Razumovsky (or Rasumovsky) string quartets, opus 59, are the quartets Ludwig van Beethoven wrote in 1806, as a result of a commission by the Russian ambassador in Vienna, Count Andreas Razumovsky:
String Quartet No. 7 in F major, Op. 59, No. 1
String Quartet No. 8 in E minor, Op. 59, No. 2
String Quartet No. 9 in C major, Op. 59, No. 3

They are the first three of what are usually known as the "Middle Period" string quartets, or simply the "Middle Quartets." The other two are opus 74 and opus 95. Many quartets record all five as a set.

Beethoven uses a characteristically Russian theme in the first two quartets in honour of the prince who gave him the commission:
 In Op. 59 No. 1, the "Thème russe" (as the score is marked) is the principal theme of the last movement.
 In Op. 59 No. 2, the Thème russe is in the B section of the third movement. This theme is based on a Russian folk song which was also utilised by Modest Mussorgsky in the coronation scene of his opera Boris Godunov, by Pyotr Tchaikovsky in the introduction to act III of his opera Mazeppa (opera), by Sergei Rachmaninoff in the sixth movement of his 6 Morceaux for Piano Duet, Op.11 "Glory" ("Slava"), and by Igor Stravinsky in his ballet The Firebird.
 In the quartet Op. 59 No. 3, there is no Thème russe explicitly named in the score, but many commentators have heard a Russian character in the subject of the Andantino movement.
All three quartets were published as a set in 1808 in Vienna.

Reception
The quartets were generally received with uncertainty, as they deviated from the established genre of string quartets in their content and emotional range. However, one review published in 1807 stated that "Three new, very long and difficult Beethoven string quartets … are attracting the attention of all connoisseurs. The conception is profound and the construction excellent, but they are not easily comprehended."

References and further reading 
 Joseph Kerman, The Beethoven Quartets.  New York, W.W. Norton & Co., 1966.  
 Robert Winter and Robert Martin, ed., The Beethoven Quartet Companion. Berkeley, University of California Press, 1994.

See also 

 List of compositions by Ludwig van Beethoven
 String Quartets Nos. 1–6, Op. 18 (Beethoven)
 Late String Quartets (Beethoven)

References

Opus 059